The following is a list of the orders, decorations, and medals given by the Sultan of Pahang, Malaysia. When applicable, post-nominal letters and non-hereditary titles are indicated. Order of precedence for the wearing of order insignias, decorations, and medals Precedence:Susunan Keutamaan Darjah Kebesaran, Bintang dan Pingat Pahang
{|
|-
| 1. || width=350px | Darjah Kerabat  || width=100px| D.K.P. || align=center| -- || Left shoulder|-
| 2. || Darjah Kerabat Sri Indra Mahkota Pahang Yang Amat Dihormati  || D.K. I || align=center| -- || width=100px | Left shoulder|-
| 3. || Darjah Kebesaran Mahkota Pahang Yang Amat Dihormati  || D.K. II  || align=center| -- 
|-
| 4. || Darjah Sri Diraja Sultan Ahmad Shah Pahang  || S.D.S.A.  || align=center | Dato' Sri Diraja 
|-
| 5. || Sri Sultan Ahmad Shah Pahang  || S.S.A.P.  || align=center | Dato' Sri
|
|-
| 6. || Sri Indera Mahkota Pahang  || S.I.M.P.  || align=center | Dato' Indera
|
|-
| 7. || Darjah Sultan Ahmad Shah Pahang  || D.S.A.P.  || align=center | Dato'''
|-
| 8. || Darjah Indera Mahkota Pahang  || D.I.M.P.  || align=center | Dato
|-
| 9. || Setia Ahmad Shah Pahang   || S.A.P.  || align=center| -- 
|-
| 10. || Setia Mahkota Pahang   || S.M.P.  || align=center| -- 
|-
| 11. || Ahli Ahmad Shah Pahang  || A.A.P.  || align=center| --  
|-
| 12. || Ahli Mahkota Pahang  || A.M.P.  || align=center| -- 
|-
| 13. || Pingat Khidmat Cemerlang  || P.K.C.  || align=center| -- 
|-
| 14. || Pingat Gagah Perwira  || P.G.P.  || align=center| -- 
|-
| 15. || Jaksa Pendamai  || J.P.  || align=center| -- 
|-
| 16. || Pingat Kelakuan Terpuji  || P.K.T.  || align=center| --  
|-
| 17. || Pingat Jasa Kebaktian  || P.J.K.  || align=center| -- 
|-
| 18. || Pingat Perkhidmatan Luar Biasa  || P.P.B.  || align=center| -- 
|}

Orders, decorations, and medals 
The Most Illustrious Royal Family Order of Pahang - Darjah Kerabat Yang Maha Mulia Utama Kerabat Diraja Pahang 
 Founded by Sultan Ahmad Shah on 24 October 1977. 
 Awarded in one class, Member or Ahli - D.K.P.

The Most Esteemed Family Order of the Crown of Indra of Pahang - Darjah Kerabat Sri Indra Mahkota Pahang Yang Amat Dihormati 
 Founded by Sultan Abu Bakar on 25 May 1967. 
 Awarded in two classes :
 1. Member 1st class - D.K. I 
 2. Member 2nd class - D.K. II

The Grand Royal Order of Sultan Ahmad Shah of Pahang - Darjah Sri Diraja Sultan Ahmad Shah Pahang 
 Founded by Sultan Ahmad Shah on 23 October 2010 in commemoration of his eightieth birthday. 
 Awarded in a single class, Grand Royal Knight or Dato’ Sri Diraja - S.D.S.A.

The Most Illustrious Order of Sultan Ahmad Shah of Pahang - Darjah Kebesaran Sri Sultan Ahmad Shah Pahang Yang Amat Mulia

 Founded by Sultan Ahmad Shah on 24 October 1977. 
 Awarded in four classes :
 1. Grand Knight or Dato' Sri - S.S.A.P.
 2. Knight Companion or Dato - D.S.A.P.
 3. Companion or Setia - S.A.P.
 4. Member or Ahli - A.A.P.The Esteemed Order of the Crown of Pahang''' - Darjah Kebesaran Mahkota Pahang Yang Dihormati Founded by Sultan Abu Bakar on 27 December 1968. 
 Awarded in four classes :
 1. Grand Knight or Dato' Indera - S.I.M.P.
 2. Knight Companion or Dato - D.I.M.P.
 3. Companion or Setia - S.M.P.
 4. Member or Ahli - A.M.P.Gallantry Medal - Pingat Gagah Perwira
 Instituted by Sultan Abu Bakar on 17 October 1951 to reward conspicuous acts of gallantry of the highest order. 
 Awarded in a single class, a silver medal - P.G.P.Distinguished Service Medal - Pingat Khidmat Cemerlang
 Instituted by Sultan Ahmad Shah on 20 October 1985 as a reward for long and distinguished services to the state. 
 Awarded in a single class, a silver medal - P.K.C.Distinguished Conduct Medal - Pingat Kelakuan Terpuji
 Instituted by Sultan Abu Bakar on 17 October 1951 as a reward for distinguished conduct in the service of the state. 
 Awarded in a single class, a bronze medal - P.K.T.Meritorious Service Medal - Pingat Jasa Kebaktian
 Instituted by Sultan Abu Bakar on 17 October 1951 as a reward for long and meritorious services to the state. 
 Awarded in a single class, a bronze medal - P.J.K.Silver Jubilee Medal - Pingat Jubli Perak Pahang
 Instituted by Sultan Abu Bakar on 29 May 1957 in commemoration of his twenty-five years as sultan. 
 Awarded in a single class, a silver medal - P.J.P.Silver Jubilee Medal - Pingat Jubli Perak Pahang
 Instituted by Sultan Ahmad Shah in 1999 to commemorate his twenty-five years as sultan. 
 Awarded in a single class, a silver medal - P.J.P.Sultan Haji Ahmad Shah Installation Medal' - Pingat Pertabalan Sultan Haji Ahmad Shah''
 Instituted to commemorate the installation of the Sultan of Pahang, Sultan Ahmad Shah, as the seventh Yang di-Pertuan Agong on 10 July 1980. 
 Awarded in three classes of medals, gold, silver and bronze.

See also 

 Orders, decorations, and medals of the Malaysian states and federal territories#Pahang
 List of post-nominal letters (Pahang)

References 

 
Pahang